The Jüdenstraße (German: Street of the Jews), is a street in central Berlin, the capital of Germany. It is in the borough of Mitte and runs between Rathausstraße and Stralauer Straße, next to the Rotes Rathaus, Berlin's town hall. It is one of the oldest streets in Berlin, dating from the late 13th century. 

Its name preserves the old East Central German expression for Jews, which was Jüden, instead of New High German Juden. The Yiddish term for Jews «יידן» (transliterated: Yidn) is based on the same German dialect form, with the German umlaut ü being represented by a «י» (here pronounced ). As the name of the street suggests, it once ran through the Jewish district of medieval Berlin, which was no ghetto-like obligatory residential area for Jews. An alley of Jüdenstraße named Großer Jüdenhof was the site of the synagogue, school and miqveh. They were founded on an estate of the Margrave of Brandenburg within his immunity district (landesherrliche Freiheit) not under Berlin's city council jurisdiction. Many Jews preferred to live close to these congregational institutions, until Elector Joachim I Nestor expelled the Jews from  Brandenburg in 1510.  

Ethnic enclaves in Germany
Streets in Berlin
Historic Jewish communities in Europe
Jews and Judaism in Berlin